Zachary Wohlman, also known as Kid Yamaka (May 23, 1988 – February 14, 2021), was an American boxer in the Welterweight division, who was an amateur and later a professional. Wohlman, a late-comer to the sport, went from juvenile delinquency to becoming the 2010 winner of the Los Angeles Golden Gloves Tournament. On February 15, 2021, it was announced that Wolhman had died at the age of 32.

He was trained by International Boxing Hall of Famer Freddie Roach, with whom he started training in 2008, and trainer Eric Brown.  His record as of December 2017 was 10–3–2. He went on to help at risk youth, joining Ring of Hope Boxing.

Early life
Zachary Wohlman was Jewish, and was born in the San Fernando Valley of Los Angeles to David Wohlman and his wife, a beautician.  He lived in Northridge, Reseda, and Woodland Hills, California.

Wohlman’s early life was marked by a lack of family structure, fights in school, military school in Texas on the Mexico border where he had his first taste of boxing, drugs, and “behind-the-barn” amateur boxing matches across the border in Mexico.  He was sent to Sylmar Juvenile Detention at age 16, worked on an oil rig in San Jose to support himself at age 17, and had brushes with the criminal justice system.  He said: "If you’re getting hit in the face for a living, something fucked up happened [in your life]".

At the age of 20, he had a bar mitzvah and started attending Shabbat Friday night dinners each week, and said "I got that sense of family and community that I didn’t grow up with."  He sported many tattoos, including a Star of David across his stomach, and wore a Star of David around his neck.  He attended weekly Jewish services, and his nickname "Yamaka" referred to his Jewish heritage.

Career

Amateur

He was the first amateur boxer taken on by International Boxing Hall of Famer Freddie Roach, with whom he started training in 2008. Roach and Eric Brown trained him during his professional career.  Brown says of him: I've had him box with world champions and contenders, and Zac's held his own with all of them. He's got mad skills, heart, determination and an eagerness to learn.

He won the California Golden Gloves Championship in 2010.  His amateur record was 18–4.

Professional
He made his professional boxing debut on December 1, 2011, at a packed Fight Night Club at Club Nokia in downtown Los Angeles, aired on Fox Sports Net, winning by unanimous decision.  On March 31 Wohlman scored his first knockout, to improve his record to 3–0 (1 KO), over Clifford McPherson.

His performance on July 12, 2012, in Hollywood brought his record up to 4–0 and led to him being on the cover of LA Weekly.  In February 2014 he defeated Luis Hernandez at the Florentine Gardens in Hollywood, California, in a four-round decision to bring his record to 7–1–1.

Movies
Wohlman appeared in the movies Golden Boy Boxing (2009), Boxer (2011), and Xander Cohen (2012).

Personal life
Wohlman was married to Serafina until his death. He died on February 14, 2021, at the age of 32.

Professional boxing record
Source: BoxRec

Notes

References

External links
 
 
 "Zachary Wohlman Interview", Big Dog Prospect Watch, by "Big Dog" Benny Henderson Jr, Doghouse Boxing, July 12, 2012
 "Interview: Exclusive-Kid Yamaka: All Class", February 20, 2014, by Kalvin Lazarte, Milk Made

Welterweight boxers
1988 births
2021 deaths
Jewish American sportspeople
Jewish boxers
American male boxers
Boxers from California
21st-century American Jews